5α-Pregnane, also known as Allopregnane or as 10β,13β-dimethyl-17β-ethyl-5α-gonane, is a steroid and a parent compound of a variety of steroid derivatives. It is one of the epimers of pregnane, the other being 5β-pregnane. Derivatives of Allopregnane include the naturally occurring steroids Allopregnanolone, Allopregnanediol, Isopregnanolone, and 5α-Dihydroprogesterone.

See also
 5β-Pregnane
 Etiocholane
 Gonane

References

Endocrinology